The turquoise ribbon is a symbol for promoting 
 Native American reparations
 Addiction Recovery
 Bone Tumor Awareness (musculoskeletal tumors & lesions, benign/malignant)
 Congenital Diaphragmatic Hernia (CDH)
 Dysautonomia
 Interstitial Cystitis
 Renal Cell Carcinoma 
 Tourette syndrome

References

Awareness ribbon